The Hexi Corridor (Xiao'erjing: حْسِ ظِوْلاْ,), also known as the Gansu Corridor, is an important historical region located in the modern western Gansu province of China. It refers to a narrow stretch of traversable and relatively arable plain west of the Yellow River's Ordos Loop, flanked between the much more elevated and inhospitable terrains of the Mongolian and Tibetan Plateaus. The name Hexi, refers to "west of the river".

As part of the Northern Silk Road, running northwest from the western section of the Ordos Loop between Yinchuan and Lanzhou, the Hexi Corridor was the most important trade route in Northwest China. It linked China proper to the historic Western Regions for traders and military incursions into Central Asia.  It is a string of oases along the northern edges of the Qilian Mountains and Altyn-Tagh, with the high and desolate Tibetan Plateau further to the south.  To the north are the Longshou, Heli and Mazong Mountains separating it from the arid Badain Jaran Desert, Gobi Desert and the cold steppes of the Mongolian Plateau.  At the western end, the route splits into three, going either north of the Tianshan Mountains or south on either side of the Tarim Basin.  At the eastern end, the mountains around Lanzhou grants access to the Longxi Basin, which leads east through Mount Long along the Wei River valley into the populous Guanzhong Plain, and then into the Central Plain.

History

Early crop dispersal
Chinese millets (Panicum miliaceum, and Setaria italica), rice, and other crops travelled westwards through the Corridor, and reached Western Asia and Europe from the fifth millennium to the second millennium BC.

Cultivated wheat, originating at the Fertile Crescent, appeared in China around 2800 BC at Donghuishan at the Hexi corridor.  Several other crops are also attested at this time period. Xishanping is another similar site in Gansu.

According to Dodson and coauthors (2013), wheat entered via the Hexi Corridor into northern Gansu around 3000 BC, although other scholars date this somewhat later.

As early as the 1st millennium BCE, silk goods began appearing in Siberia, having traveled over the northern branch of the Silk Road, including the Hexi Corridor segment.

Qin dynasty
At the end of the Qin dynasty (221–206 BCE), the Yuezhi overcame previous settlers, the Wusun and Qiang, occupying the western Hexi Corridor. Later, the newly risen Xiongnu armies under Modu Chanyu vanquished and expelled the Yuezhi, and established a dominant confederacy empire during the Chu-Han contention and the early Han dynasty.

Han dynasty

During the reign of Emperor Wen of Han, Modu's son Laoshang Chanyu defeated Yuezhi again in 162 BCE, forcing the westward exodus of majority of the Yuezhi survivors (later known as the Greater Yuezhi) into Central Asia, while the small portion of Yuezhi population that didn't migrate (known as the Lesser Yuezhi) was forced to mixed among the Qiang people and become the subjects of Xiongnu's Worthy Prince of the Right.  At this point, the Hexi Corridor was under complete Xiongnu control, mainly occupied by the two tribes of Hunye and Xiutu.

In 138 BCE, Emperor Wu sent Zhang Qian as the ambassador to the Western Regions in an attempt to make contact with Greater Yuezhi.  Zhang Qian's envoy was intercepted by Xiongnu while travelling through the Hexi Corridor, and he was held a captive for ten years, until he finally escaped and continued his mission further west.  He eventually arrived at Yuezhi territory, but was unable to convince the Yuezhi leaders to ally against Xiongnu.  On his return journey he was once again captured by Xiongnu while traversing the Hexi Corridor, but again managed to escape two years later.  He finally returned to Chang'an in 125 BCE, bring back invaluable detailed information about the various Central Asian kingdoms such as Dayuan, Daxia and Kangju, as well as other farther countries such as Anxi, Tiaozhi, Shendu and Wusun.

During the Han–Xiongnu War, Han general Huo Qubing expelled the Xiongnu from the Hexi Corridor and even drove them from Lop Nur when King Hunye surrendered to Huo Qubing in 121 BCE.  The Han Empire acquired a new territory with trade access to the Western Regions, and also cutting the Xiongnu off from their Qiang allies.  Again in 111 BCE, Han forces repelled a joint Xiongnu-Qiang invasion, and to consolidate the control of the region, four new commanderies were established in the Hexi Corridor, namely (from east to west) Wuwei, Zhangye, Jiuquan and Dunhuang, collectively known as the Four Commanderies of Hexi.

From roughly 115–60 BCE, Han forces fought the Xiongnu over control of the oasis city-states in the Tarim Basin.  Han was eventually victorious and established the Protectorate of the Western Regions in 60 BCE, which dealt with the region's defense and foreign affairs.

During the turbulent reign of Wang Mang, Han lost control over the Tarim Basin, which was reconquered by the Xiongnu in 63 CE and used as a base to invade the Hexi Corridor.  Dou Gu defeated the Xiongnu again at the Battle of Yiwulu in 73 CE, evicting them from Turpan and chasing them as far as Lake Barkol before establishing a garrison at Hami.

After the new Protector General of the Western Regions Chen Mu was killed in 75 CE by allies of the Xiongnu in Karasahr and Kucha, the garrison at Hami was withdrawn.  At the Battle of the Altai Mountains in 89 CE, Dou Xian defeated the Northern Chanyu, who retreated into the Altai Mountains.  The Han forces, allied with the subjugated Southern Xiongnu, again defeated the Northern Chanyu twice in 90 CE and 91 CE, forcing him to flee west into Wusun and Kangju territories.

Tang dynasty

The Tang dynasty fought the Tibetan Empire for control of areas in Inner and Central Asia. There was a long string of conflicts with Tibet over territories in the Tarim Basin between 670 and 692 .

In 763 the Tibetans even captured the Tang capital of Chang'an for fifteen days during the An Lushan Rebellion. It was during this rebellion that the Tang withdrew its western garrisons stationed in what is now Gansu and Qinghai, which the Tibetans then occupied along with the area that is modern Xinjiang. Hostilities between the Tang and Tibet continued until they signed a formal peace treaty in 821. The terms of this treaty, including fixed borders between the two countries, are recorded in a bilingual inscription on a stone pillar outside the Jokhang in Lhasa.

Western Xia dynasty

The Western Xia dynasty was established in the 11th century by the Tangut people. Western Xia controlled from 1038 CE up to 1227 CE the areas in what are now the northwestern Chinese provinces of Gansu, Shaanxi, and Ningxia.

Yuan dynasty

Genghis Khan began the conquest of the Jin dynasty around 1207 and Ögedei Khan continued it after his death in 1227. The Jurchen-led Jin dynasty fell in 1234 CE with help from the Han-ruled Southern Song dynasty.

Ögedei also conquered the Western Xia dynasty in 1227, pacifying the Hexi Corridor region, which was later absorbed into the Yuan dynasty.

Geography and climate
There are many fertile oases along the path, watered by rivers flowing from the Qilian Mountains, such as the Shiyang, Jinchuan, Ejin (Heihe), and Shule Rivers.

A strikingly inhospitable environment surrounds this chain of oases:  the snow-capped Qilian Mountains (the so-called "southern mountains" or "Nanshan") to the south; the Beishan ("northern mountains") mountainous area, the Alashan Plateau, and the vast expanse of the Gobi desert to the north. Geologically, the Hexi Corridor belongs to a Cenozoic foreland basin system on the northeast margin of the Tibetan Plateau.

It was an area where mountain and desert limited caravan traffic to a narrow trackway, where relatively small fortifications could control passing traffic.

There are several major cities along the Hexi Corridor. In western Gansu Province is Dunhuang (Shazhou), then Yumen, then Jiayuguan, then Jiuquan (Suzhou), then Zhangye (Ganzhou) in the center, then Jinchang, then Wuwei (Liangzhou) and finally Lanzhou in the southeast. In the past, Dunhuang was part of the area known as the Western Regions. South of Gansu Province, in the middle just over the provincial boundary, lies the city of Xining, the capital of Qinghai Province. Xining used to be the chief commercial hub of the Hexi Corridor.

The Jiayuguan fort guards the western entrance to China. The Jiayuguan fort is the first fortification of Great Wall of China in the west.

See also
Liang Province 
Juyan Lake Basin
 Silk Road transmission of Buddhism

References

Citations

Sources 
 Yap, Joseph P. (2009), Wars With The Xiongnu: A Translation From Zizhi tongjian. AuthorHouse, .
 Yap, Joseph P. (2019), The Western Regions Xiongnu and Han: From the Shiji, Hanshu and Hou Hanshu. 

History of Gansu
Sites along the Silk Road
Geography of Gansu
Geopolitical corridors
Historical regions